Nikos Kalaitzidis is a Greek-American visual effects artist. He was nominated for an Academy Award in the category Best Visual Effects for the film Free Guy.

Selected filmography 
 Free Guy (2021; co-nominated with Swen Gillberg, Bryan Grill and Dan Sudick)

References

External links 

Living people
Place of birth missing (living people)
Year of birth missing (living people)
Visual effects artists
Visual effects supervisors
Greek emigrants to the United States